Apagomerina diadela is a species of beetle in the family Cerambycidae. It was described by Martins and Galileo in 1996. It comes from Venezuela.

References

diadela
Beetles described in 1996